XEGLO-AM/XHGJO-FM (La Voz de la Sierra Juárez – "The Voice of the Sierra Juárez") is an indigenous community radio station that broadcasts in Zapotec, Mixe and Chinantec from Guelatao de Juárez in the Mexican state of Oaxaca. It is run by the Cultural Indigenist Broadcasting System (SRCI) of the National Commission for the Development of Indigenous Peoples (CDI).

History
On 21 March 1990, test transmissions began for XEGLO, at half power and only operating during the late morning and early afternoon. The station began full service on 17 November.

XHGJO-FM was awarded to the CDI in 2017.

External links
XEGLO website

References

Indigenous peoples of Oaxaca
Chinantec-language radio stations
Sistema de Radiodifusoras Culturales Indígenas
Mixe-language radio stations
Radio stations in Oaxaca
Zapotec-language radio stations
Radio stations established in 1990
Daytime-only radio stations in Mexico